The year 1866 in science and technology involved some significant events, listed below.

Astronomy
 May – William Huggins studies the emission spectrum of a nova and discovers that it is surrounded by a cloud of hydrogen.
 June 4 – Pluto (not known at this time) reaches its only aphelion between 1618 and 2113.
 Giovanni Schiaparelli realizes that meteor streams occur when the Earth passes through the orbit of a comet that has left debris along its path.

Biology
 Gregor Mendel publishes his laws of inheritance.
 Ernst Haeckel challenges the plant/animal division of life, observing that single celled organisms, the protists, do not fit into either category.
 Élie Metchnikoff describes the early separation of "polecells" (progenital cells) in parthenogenetic Diptera.
 Robert John Lechmere Guppy discovers the guppy (fish) in Trinidad.
 Frederick Smith first discovers Formica candida in the Bournemouth district of England, describing it as Formica gagates.
 Nikolai Kaufman publishes his Moscow Flora.

Chemistry
 Dynamite invented by Alfred Nobel.
 August von Hofmann proposes the now standard system of hydrocarbon nomenclature and invents the Hofmann voltameter.
 Emil Erlenmeyer proposes that naphthalene has a structure of two fused benzene rings.

Earth sciences
 January 26 – Volcanic eruption in the Santorini caldera begins.

Mathematics
 The second smallest pair of amicable numbers (1184, 1210) is discovered by teenager B. Nicolò I. Paganini.

Medicine
 February 21 – Lucy Hobbs Taylor becomes the world's first woman to receive a doctorate from a dental college (Ohio College of Dental Surgery).
 July – Elizabeth Garrett Anderson opens the St Mary's Dispensary in London where women can seek medical advice from exclusively female practitioners.
 Max Schultze discovers two sorts of 'receptors' in the retina.
 Dr John Langdon Down publishes his theory that different types of mental condition can be classified by ethnic characteristics, notably "Mongolism", the genetic developmental disability now known as Down syndrome.
 Invention of a clinical thermometer by Thomas Clifford Allbutt.
 A cholera epidemic in London causes over 5,000 deaths.
 Patrick Manson starts a school of tropical medicine in Hong Kong.

Paleontology
 American paleontologist Joseph Leidy describes the new genus and species Laelaps aquilunguis, demonstrating that theropod dinosaurs walked on their hind limbs rather than on all fours as in earlier reconstructions.

Physics
 James Clerk Maxwell formulates the Maxwell–Boltzmann distribution in the kinetic theory of gases.

Technology
 January 12 – Royal Aeronautical Society is formed as 'The Aeronautical Society of Great Britain' in London, the world's oldest such society.
 July 27 – The  successfully completes laying the transatlantic telegraph cable between Valentia Island, Ireland and Heart's Content, Newfoundland, permanently restoring a communications link.
 August 23 – Ralph H. Twedell patents the hydraulic riveter in the United Kingdom.

Awards
 Copley Medal: Julius Plücker
 Wollaston Medal for Geology: Charles Lyell

Births
 February 1 – Agda Meyerson (died 1924), Swedish nurse and healthcare profession activist
 February 8 – Moses Gomberg (died 1947), Russian-born chemist
 February 14 – Victor Despeignes (died 1937), French pioneer of radiation oncology
 February 26 – Herbert Henry Dow (died 1930), Canadian-born chemist
 April 17 – Ernest Starling (died 1927), English physiologist
 July 13 – Emily Winifred Dickson (died 1944), Irish-born gynaecologist
 July 25 – Frederick Blackman (died 1947, English plant physiologist
 September 13 – Arthur Pollen (died 1937), English inventor
 September 21 – H. G. Wells (died 1946), English scientific populariser
 September 25 – Thomas Hunt Morgan (died 1945), American biologist, Nobel laureate in Physiology
 October 8 – Reginald Fessenden (died 1932), Canadian pioneer of radio broadcasting
 November 11 – Martha Annie Whiteley (died 1956), English chemist and mathematician
 November 30 – Robert Broom (died 1951), Scottish-born paleontologist
 December 7 – Maude Delap (died 1953), Irish marine biologist

Deaths
 March 6 – William Whewell (born 1794), English scientist, philosopher and historian of science
 March 14 – Alexander Morison (born 1779), Scottish physician and psychiatrist
 April 4 – William Dick (born 1793), Scottish veterinarian
 April 5 – Thomas Hodgkin (born 1798), English physician
 July 20 – Bernhard Riemann (born 1826), German-born mathematician
 September 16 - François Mêlier (born 1798), French physician 
 October 18 – Philipp Franz von Siebold (born 1796), German physician, botanist and traveler in Japan
 December 1 – George Everest (born 1790), British surveyor and geographer

References

 
Science, 1866 In
1860s in science
19th century in science